The Ballad of Siberia (in ), also known as Symphony of Life, produced by Mosfilm  and released in 1948, was the Soviet Union's second color film (after The Stone Flower). It was directed by Ivan Pyryev and starred Vladimir Druzhnikov and Marina Ladynina.  

It is a Soviet style musical movie, full of songs, such as "The Wanderer", describing the development of Siberia after World War II.

Synopsis
Pianist Andrei Balashov (Vladimir Druzhnikov) after being wounded at the front during the Great Patriotic War loses the opportunity to earnestly pursue music due to a hand injury. Without saying goodbye to his friends and his beloved Natasha (Marina Ladynina), he goes to Siberia. He works on the construction of a plant, and in the evenings sings in a teahouse. By chance, weather conditions force the plane with Andrey's friends, Boris Olenich (Vladimir Zeldin) and Natasha, who are flying to a competition abroad, to land at the airport near the building of the plant. Andrey meets them and it changes his life. He travels to the Arctic and inspired by the heroic labor of the builders to write a symphonic oratorio "Ballad of Siberia", which receives universal recognition.

Cast
 Vladimir Druzhnikov as Andrei Nikolayevich Balashov
 Marina Ladynina as Natasha Pavlovna Malinina
 Boris Andreyev as Yakov Zakharonovich Burmak
 Vera Vasileva as Nastenka Petrovna Gusenkova
 Sergei Kalinin as Kornei Nefedovich Zavorin
 Yelena Savitskaya as Kapitolina Kondratyevna
 Vladimir Zeldin as Boris Olenich
 Mikhail Sidorkin as Sergei Tomakurov
 Grigoriy Shpigel as Grigori "Grisha" Galadya

Songs
It is a musical movie, with songs both old and new. The most notable songs are:
 "The Song of the Siberian Earth" (words by Yevgeniy Dolmatovsky, music by Nikolai Kryukov)
 "The Hymn to Siberia" (words by Yevgeniy Dolmatovsky, music by Nikolai Kryukov)
 "The Wanderer" (in )

Influence
This film was so successful that a second color musical film, Cossacks of the Kuban was made two years later by the same director and cast.

This movie also became popular in Japan, so it gave influence to the Utagoe Movement and Utagoe coffeehouse in the 1950s, eventually leading to the Karaoke phenomenon in the 1970s.

See also
 Cinema of the Soviet Union
 Cinema of Russia
 Utagoe coffeehouse
 Karaoke

References

External links

1947 films
1940s Russian-language films
Soviet musical films
Films set in Siberia
1948 musical films
1948 films
Films directed by Ivan Pyryev